Degol Woyane is a tabia or municipality in the Dogu'a Tembien district of the Tigray Region of Ethiopia. It includes Dabba Selama, the oldest monastery of Ethiopia, and the most inaccessible in the world. The tabia centre is in Zala village, located approximately 10 km to the west of the woreda town Hagere Selam.

Geography 
The tabia stretches down west of Melfa, along the westernmost ridge of Dogu'a Tembien. The highest peak is T'afa (2580 m a.s.l.) and the lowest place Addi Welo (1990 m a.s.l.).

Geology 
From the higher to the lower locations, the following geological formations are present:
 Lower basalt
 Amba Aradam Formation
 Adigrat Sandstone

Springs 
As there are no permanent rivers, the presence of springs is of utmost importance for the local people. The following are the springs in the tabia:
 May Dara in Zala
 Addi Welo

Livelihood 
The population lives essentially from crop farming, supplemented with off-season work in nearby towns. The land is dominated by farmlands which are clearly demarcated and are cropped every year. Hence the agricultural system is a permanent upland farming system.

Population 
The tabia centre Zala holds a few administrative offices and some small shops. The main other populated places in the tabia are:

Religion and rock churches 
Most inhabitants are Orthodox Christians. The following rock churches are located in the tabia:

The almost inaccessible Dabba Selama monastery is assumed to be the first monastery established in Ethiopia, by Saint Frumentius. The intrepid visitor will climb down, then scramble over narrow ledges along precipices, and finally climb an overhanging cliff. The mesa also comprises a church hewn in Adigrat Sandstone, in shape of a small basilica. The carvers attempted to establish four bays as well as with a recess. The pillars are rounded (which is uncommon) and expand at either end, supporting arches that appear as triangles. Women are not allowed to do the ascent, nor to visit monastery or church. Independently from the difficult access to the monastery, the surrounding sandstone geomorphology is unique.

The Amani'el church in May Baha has also been carved in Adigrat Sandstone. Behind a pronaos (1960s), the rock church has cruciform columns, flat beams and a flat ceiling, a single arch, and a flat rear wall without apse. Windows give light to the church itself. Emperor Yohannes IV was baptised in this church.

History 
The history of the tabia is strongly confounded with the history of Tembien.

Schools 
Almost all children of the tabia are schooled, though in some schools there is lack of classrooms, directly related to the large intake in primary schools over the last decades. Schools in the tabia include Atse Yohannes school in Zala.

Roads and communication 
A rural access road links Zala to the main asphalt road in Hagere Selam. It is also connected through a disused road to Werkamba in the West.

Tourism 
Its mountainous nature, monastery and rock church make the tabia fit for tourism.

Touristic attractions 
 Daba Selama monastery
 May Baha rock church
 Grand-canyon-like landscapes

Geotouristic sites 
The high variability of geological formations and the rugged topography invites for geological and geographic tourism or "geotourism". Geosites in the tabia include:

Birdwatching 
Birdwatching (for the species, see the main Dogu'a Tembien page) can be done particularly in exclosures and forests. The following bird-watching sites have been inventoried in the tabia and mapped.
 Zala slope forest
 May Baha church forest
 May Mirara forest

Trekking routes 
Trekking routes have been established in this tabia. The tracks are not marked on the ground but can be followed using downloaded .GPX files.
 Route 4, from Hagere Selam, through Ferrey and Dabba Selama to Kola Tembien
 Route 5, from Hagere Selam, through May Baha to Kola Tembien
 Route 25, from Zala, along the ridge through Geramba to Kola Tembien
All treks require good physical condition and will take (at least) a full day.

Inda Siwa, the local beer houses 
In the main villages, there are traditional beer houses (Inda Siwa), often in unique settings, which are a good place for resting and chatting with the local people. Most renown in the tabia are
 Tinsue Brhane at Zala
 Letebrhan Gerese'a at Zala

Accommodation and facilities 
The facilities are very basic.  One may be invited to spend the night in a rural homestead or ask permission to pitch a tent. Hotels are available in Hagere Selam, Werqamba, Abiy Addi and Mekelle.

More detailed information 
For more details on environment, agriculture, rural sociology, hydrology, ecology, culture, etc., see the overall page on the Dogu'a Tembien district.

Gallery

References 

Dogu'a Tembien
Populated places in the Tigray Region